Epichloë funkii is a hybrid asexual species in the fungal genus Epichloë. 

A systemic and seed-transmissible grass symbiont first described in 2007,  Epichloë funkii is a natural allopolyploid of Epichloë elymi and Epichloë festucae.

Epichloë funkii is found in North America, where it has been identified in the grass species Achnatherum robustum.

References

funkii
Fungi described in 2007
Fungi of North America